Quesnelia violacea is a species of flowering plant in the family Bromeliaceae, endemic to Brazil (southeastern  São Paulo). It was first described in 2006.

References

violacea
Endemic flora of Brazil
Flora of the Atlantic Forest
Flora of São Paulo (state)
Plants described in 2006